The Aceramarca gracile opossum or Bolivian gracile opossum (Gracilinanus aceramarcae) is a species of opossum. It is native to Bolivia and Peru, where it occurs in tropical elfin forest habitat.

This opossum is mostly arboreal, but it may forage on the ground for food.

This species has been recorded at only six locations, but it is not considered to be threatened because its habitat is relatively secure from deforestation and other threats at this time.

This mouse opossum does not have a pouch. It is reddish or grayish brown in color with a cream-colored belly and a dark eye ring.

References

Opossums
Fauna of the Andes
Marsupials of South America
EDGE species
Mammals described in 1931
Taxonomy articles created by Polbot